Tim Welsh (born October 4, 1960) is an American college basketball coach and the former head basketball coach at Providence College.  Previously, he served as the head coach at Iona College. He also served briefly as head men's basketball coach at Hofstra University.  He now serves as an analyst for ESPN.

Background
Born in Massena, New York, Welsh is a 1984 graduate of SUNY Potsdam, where he played basketball for his father, Jerry. In his sophomore season, the Bears won the Division III National Championship. During his senior season, he was a co-captain. He also attended a year at Worcester Academy.  Following his college career, he became a volunteer assistant under Pat Kennedy at Iona College, before becoming a full-time assistant under Kennedy at Florida State University.  He later served as an assistant under Jim Boeheim at Syracuse University before joining his father, then the coach at Iona, as an assistant coach in 1991.

During the 1994-95 season, Jerry Welsh became ill and Tim served as the interim coach during his absence, guiding the Gaels to a 5-5 record in ten games.  Following the season, Jerry was forced to retire and Tim was named the head coach on a permanent basis.  In his first full season as head coach, the Gaels tied for the Metro Atlantic Athletic Conference regular-season title; in his second and third seasons, the Gaels won the title outright.  Iona reached the 1998 NCAA tournament with a 27-6 record.  This was Iona's first tournament appearance since 1985.  Overall, Welsh went 70-22 in three seasons at Iona, and he was named MAAC Coach of the Year in both 1997 and 1998.

On November 16, 2008, Welsh made his debut on ESPNU serving as the color analyst for the Le Moyne vs Syracuse basketball game.

On April 1, 2010, Welsh was introduced as the new head coach at Hofstra University.

Career at Providence
On April 2, 1998, Welsh was named the head coach at Providence College, the thirteenth head basketball coach in school history.

Under Welsh, Providence has made five postseason appearances, reaching the NCAA Tournament in 2001 and 2004 and the NIT in 1999, 2003, and 2007.  However, Welsh did not have the success in Providence that he had at Iona. In his ten seasons as head coach of Providence, Welsh did not win an NCAA Tournament game and only won one Big East tournament game. During the 2007-2008 season, Welsh was under heavy pressure from fans and the Providence College administration. Most thought that he would be terminated if the Friars were unsuccessful in the post season..  On March 15, 2008, Tim Welsh was fired as head coach of the Providence Friars, due to the inconsistent performance over ten years and the failure to lead the Friars to post-season success.

Career at Hofstra
On April 30, 2010, one month after he had been hired as the new head coach at Hofstra University, Welsh resigned from Hofstra before ever coaching a game.

College basketball analyst
Welsh joined ESPN in November 2008 as a college basketball analyst.  Welsh is also a game and studio analyst for SportsNet New York and Comcast SportsNet New England.

Head coaching record

References

Living people
1960 births
American men's basketball coaches
American men's basketball players
Basketball coaches from New York (state)
Basketball players from New York (state)
College men's basketball head coaches in the United States
Florida State Seminoles men's basketball coaches
Iona Gaels men's basketball coaches
People from Massena, New York
Providence Friars men's basketball coaches
SUNY Potsdam Bears men's basketball players
Syracuse Orange men's basketball coaches